Arthur Lester Benton (October 16, 1909 – December 27, 2006) was a neuropsychologist and Emeritus Professor of Neurology and Psychology at the University of Iowa.

Biography 
He received his A.B. from Oberlin College in 1931, his A.M. from Oberlin College in 1933 and his Ph.D. from Columbia University in 1935. He acquired his training as a psychologist at the Payne Whitney Psychiatric Clinic of New York Hospital.  Early in 1941, Benton volunteered for service in the U.S. Navy and was commissioned as a lieutenant in the medical department.  His active duty lasted until 1945, followed by many years of service in the U.S. Navy Reserve, retiring at the rank of captain.  In 1946 Benton accepted an appointment as associate professor of Psychology at the University of Louisville.  In 1948, he moved to the University of Iowa as professor and director of graduate training in clinical psychology.  In 1958 he became professor of psychology and neurology, retiring in 1978, at which time the Benton Laboratory of Neuropsychology in the Division of Behavioral Neurology was dedicated.  At Iowa he supervised 46 doctoral dissertations and 24 master's theses.  He was the author of numerous books and the creator of a number of neuropsychological testing instruments, including the Benton Visual Retention Test (BVRT).

He was the husband of the late Professor Rita Benton, Professor of Musicology at the University of Iowa, and father of Raymond Stetson Benton, Abigail Benton Sivan, and Daniel Joseph Benton.

Awards and honors 
Distinguished Professional Contribution Award from the American Psychological Association (1978)
Outstanding Scientific Contribution of the International Neuropsychological Society (1981)
Samuel Torrey Orton Award of the Orton Dyslexia Society (1982)
Distinguished Service and Outstanding Contribution Award of the American Board of Professional Psychology (1985)
First speaker in an annual series of lectures initiated by the New York Neuropsychology Group and the Psychology Section of the New York Academy of Sciences, featuring important figures in the development of neuropsychology, subsequently named The Arthur L. Benton Lecture in his honor.(1986)
Distinguished Clinical Neuropsychological Award of the National Academy of Neuropsychology (1989)
Gold Medal Award for Life Achievement in the Application of Psychology from the American Psychological Foundation, for which the citation reads: "For lifetime contributions that include pioneering clinical studies of brain-behavior relations. He introduced novel and objective psychological assessment techniques that expanded our understanding of the difficulties manifested by neurologically compromised patients. He broadened the applications of psychology and in the process opened up a new field of study and practice, clinical neuropsychology." (1992)

See also
 Judgment of Line Orientation

References 

1909 births
2006 deaths
Deaths from emphysema
Respiratory disease deaths in Illinois
American neurologists
20th-century American psychologists
Oberlin College alumni